Fucus gardneri is a species of seaweed, a brown alga living on the littoral shore of the Pacific coasts of North America. It has the common names of rockweed and bladderwrack.

Description 
Fucus gardneri is olive brown in colour and similar to Fucus spiralis. It has airsacks at the top.

Life history 
The tips of mature individuals swell up and provide flotation for the plant as well as reproductive chambers for developing sperm and eggs. During low tide, the swollen tips dry up squeezing out sperm and eggs which unite into a zygote during the next flood tide and settle onto a substratum.

Ecology 
Rockweed can form thick bands in the middle intertidal on rocky substrates.  The other common species of Fucus: Fucus spiralis, Fucus vesiculosus and Fucus serratus along with Ascophyllum nodosum form the main and dominant seaweeds on rocky shores. These three species, along with two others Pelvetia canaliculata and Ascophyllum nodosum form the zones along the shore.

Uses and history 
Native Americans historically harvested the dried swollen tips of Fucus gardneri – sometimes referred to as "Indian pop corn". When the airbubbles are popped, it secretes a thick lotion, very moisturizing.

References

Further reading

External links
Fucus gardneri at Algaebase

Fucaceae